Brugnoli is a surname. Notable people with the surname include:

Amalia Brugnoli (1802–1892), Italian ballerina
Annibale Brugnoli (1843–1915), Italian painter
Attilio Brugnoli (1880–1937), Italian composer, pianist and musicologist
Emanuele Brugnoli (1859–1944), Italian painter and engraver
Patrick Brugnoli (born 1970), Italian ice hockey player
Renato Brugnoli (born 1969), Swiss footballer